El baño is a 2005 Chilean black comedy film directed by Gregory Cohen with Juan Pablo Bastidas, Faride Kaid, Aline Küppenheim and Ramón Llao. The action takes place in a bathroom in a family house in Santiago at the time of the Chilean military coup of 1973. The action is all shot with a camera fixed in a corner.

Cast
Alex Zisis
Pablo Macaya
Faryde Kaid as Ángela
Aline Küppenheim
Eduardo Marambio
Juan Barahona
Juan Pablo Bastidas as the Doctor
Ramón Llao
Lía Maldonado
Jaime MacManus
Igor Rosenmann
Loreto Moya
Álvaro Espinoza
José Luis Aguilera
Liliana García

Awards
 Premio Especial del Público (Special Public Prize), Festival Internacional de Cine Digital de Viña del Mar (International Film Festival in Viña del Mar), Chile, 2005 
 Premio Especial del Jurado (Special Jury Prize), Premio Especial del Público Festival Internacional de Cine Latinoamericano Marseille (Special Prize of the Public International Festival of Latin American film in Marseille), France, 2006

References

External links
 

2005 films
2005 black comedy films
Chilean black comedy films
2000s Spanish-language films